Fred Crosset (born 6 April 1975 in Verviers, Belgium), is a former Belgian International motorcycle trials rider. Crosset is a 10 time Belgian Trials Champion and American NATC Pro Champion in 2001 and 2002. He currently runs the Circus Trial Tour.

Biography

In 1998 Crosset competed in the FIM European Trials Championship series. He took his first podium of the year at the second round in Portugal with a 3rd place. His best placing of the series was a 2nd place in Italy. Crosset finished the season in a creditable 5th position.

Back in the European Championships for 1999, Crosset finished the season in 3rd place with a best position of 2nd in Italy.

A change of scenery in 2001 as Crosset moved to America to compete in the NATC National Championships. Showing a difference in level between the Euro championships and the NATC, Crosset racked up wins in each of the first four rounds before Ryon Bell managed to get back on the top step at the New York round. Geoff Aaron took the wins in New Mexico with Crosset second, but a pair wins in Nebraska sealed the Championship win for Crosset.

Again in the NATC championship for 2002, a shaky start in Florida as 2000 Champion Geoff Aaron took a pair of wins leaving Crosset 14 points adrift. It was not to cause a problem however, as Crosset followed up with seven straight wins across the country to clinch his second straight NATC title.

After leaving the United States Crosset returned to contest the FIM European Championships for the 2003 season. His season best finish was a 3rd place at the opening round in France. He finished the season in 5th place.

National Trials Championship Career

International Trials Championship Career

Honors
 US National NATC Pro Trials Champion 2001, 2002

Related Reading
NATC Trials Championship
FIM Trial European Championship
FIM Trial World Championship

References 

1975 births
Living people
Belgian motorcycle racers
Motorcycle trials riders
People from Verviers
Sportspeople from Liège Province